Jack Francis Needham OBE (1842–1924) was a British officer in the Bengal Police who was posted in the Eastern Himalayan region during the late 19th and early 20th centuries. He authored several pioneering descriptions of Sino-Tibetan and Tai-Kadai languages in the area.

Biography
Jack Francis Needham (often referenced as J. F. Needham) was an Officer in the Bengal Police in the mid-to-late 19th century, later appointed Political Officer at the British outpost of Sadiya in Assam in 1882. Needham conducted a tour of the "Abor" (Adi) area in the Siang River Valley (modern-day East Siang District in Arunachal Pradesh state) in 1884, which established British relations with a small segment of the Tani hill tribes.

Research and publications
During his tenure in Sadiya Needham completed the first ever descriptions of several regional languages, including the Eastern Tani language Mising, the Sal language Singpho and Tai Khamti, as well as an ethnographic travelogue of his journey from Sadiya to South-Eastern Tibet.

References

1842 births
1924 deaths
Sino-Tibetan languages
Officers of the Order of the British Empire
Linguists from the United Kingdom